Liropilio is a genus of harvestmen in the family Phalangiidae.

Species
 Liropilio przhevalskii N. I. Gritsenko, 1979
 Liropilio stukanovi N. I. Gritsenko, 1979

References

Harvestmen
Harvestman genera